Sergei Aleksandrovich Prikhodko (born 7 March 1962) is a Russian professional football coach and a former player.

Club career
He made his professional debut in the Soviet Second League in 1980 for Spartak Kostroma.

He played for CSKA Moscow in the USSR Federation Cup.

Personal life
His son Sergei Sergeyevich Prikhodko is also a professional footballer.

Honours
 USSR Federation Cup finalist: 1986.
 He was on the rosters when FC Zenit Leningrad and PFC CSKA Moscow won the Soviet Top League in 1984 and 1991 respectively, but did not play in a single league game in either of those seasons.

References

1962 births
Sportspeople from Karaganda
Living people
Soviet footballers
Russian footballers
Association football goalkeepers
FC Spartak Kostroma players
FC Iskra Smolensk players
FC Zenit Saint Petersburg players
FC Metallurg Lipetsk players
FC Rotor Volgograd players
PFC CSKA Moscow players
TJ OFC Gabčíkovo players
Soviet Top League players
Russian Premier League players
Russian expatriate footballers
Expatriate footballers in Slovakia
Russian expatriate sportspeople in Czechoslovakia
Russian expatriate sportspeople in Slovakia
Russian football managers
JK Narva Trans managers
Russian expatriate football managers
Expatriate football managers in Ukraine
Expatriate football managers in Belarus
Expatriate football managers in Estonia
Russian expatriate sportspeople in Ukraine
Russian expatriate sportspeople in Belarus
Russian expatriate sportspeople in Estonia